Chukovezer Island is the rocky island lying  off the northwest coast of Anvers Island in the Palmer Archipelago, Antarctica.

The island is named after the settlement of Chukovezer in Western Bulgaria.

Location
British mapping in 1974.

Maps
 Anvers Island and Brabant Island. Scale 1:250000 topographic map. BAS 250 Series, Sheet SQ 19-20/3&4. London, 1974.
 Antarctic Digital Database (ADD). Scale 1:250000 topographic map of Antarctica. Scientific Committee on Antarctic Research (SCAR). Since 1993, regularly upgraded and updated.

References
 Bulgarian Antarctic Gazetteer. Antarctic Place-names Commission. (details in Bulgarian, basic data in English)
 Chukovezer Island. SCAR Composite Antarctic Gazetteer.

External links
 Chukovezer Island. Copernix satellite image

Islands of the Palmer Archipelago
Bulgaria and the Antarctic